Scenic Sites (명승, 名勝) of South Korea are "Places of natural beauty with great historic, artistic or scenic values, which feature distinctive uniqueness and rarity originated from their formation processes" so designated by the Cultural Heritage Administration, an agency of the South Korean government. The first was designated in 1979 and, as of 2020, 115 Scenic Sites have designated at a national level:

See also

 Heritage preservation in South Korea
 Places of Scenic Beauty of Japan

References

External links
  Heritage Classification
  Scenic Sites
  Scenic Sites

Scenic Sites of South Korea